The 1964 United States Senate election in Missouri took place on November 3, 1964. Incumbent Democratic U.S. Senator Stuart Symington was re-elected to a third term in office over Republican Jean Paul Bradshaw.

Democratic primary

Candidates
Stuart Symington, incumbent Senator since 1953
William McKinley Thomas, perennial candidate
Wilford G. Winholtz

Results

Republican primary

Candidates
Jean Paul Bradshaw, nominee for Governor in 1944
Morris Duncan

Results

General election

Results

See also 
 1964 United States Senate elections

References

Missouri
1964
1964 Missouri elections